Valentina Aleksandrovna Malyavina (18 June 1941 – 30 October 2021) was a Soviet and Russian actress of theater and cinema.  She is best known for roles in Ivan's Childhood (1962) and King Stag (1969).

Biography
Malyavina was born in Moscow on 18 June 1941.

In 1962 she graduated from the Boris Shchukin Theatre Institute and was accepted into the troupe of the Lenkom Theatre. From 1965 to 1979 she served in the Vakhtangov Theatre. In 1979, she moved to the National Film Actors' Theatre, where she worked until 1983, and since 1988 at the Moscow Theatre Artist.

Her first husband (1959–1963) was actor Aleksandr Zbruyev.

In 1978 she was held as a suspect in the murder of her civil husband, actor Stanislav Zhdanko, but the case was closed. In 1983, at the request of the relatives of the deceased, the case was reviewed, and the court sentenced her to nine years in prison. She did not admit her guilt at the trial, she continued to insist on her innocence in an interview given after her release.

In 1988, she was released under an amnesty under the Decree of the Presidium of the Supreme Soviet of the USSR of 18 June 1987, in connection with the seventieth anniversary of Soviet power.

In 1993 she was awarded the title of Honored Artist of Russia.

In 2001, as a result of the trauma, she lost her sight, she lived in a specialized boarding house.

She died on 30 October 2021, at the age of 81. She was buried at the Troyekurovskoye Cemetery in Moscow. Her death was announced on 10 November.

Selected filmography
 Ivan's Childhood (1962) as Masha
 A Literature Lesson (1968) as Nina Vronskaya
 King Stag (1969) as Angela 
 Red Square (1970) as Natasha Kutasova
 The Nose (1977) as episode (uncredited)

Honors and awards
 Honored Artist of Russia (1993)
 Nika Award (1993) — Best Supporting Actor or Actress (nom)

References

External links
 
 Actors of Soviet and Russian cinema. Valentina Malyavina 

1941 births
2021 deaths
Russian film actresses
Soviet film actresses
Soviet stage actresses
Russian stage actresses
Actresses from Moscow
Honored Artists of the Russian Federation
Russian blind people
Burials in Troyekurovskoye Cemetery